VH1 Indonesia or simply VH1 was a television channel broadcast nationality in Indonesia. A spin-off of MTV Indonesia, this program is focused on local and international music. It is a joint venture between MTV Networks Asia Pacific and Media Nusantara Citra. Most of the programs are usually VH1 The Best Mix, and VH1 Time Machine. It is an Indonesian version of the original VH1.

History
In the beginning VH1 Indonesia is parts of MTV Indonesia but they separated and now VH1 Indonesia aired itself.

Comparison with MTV Indonesia
Compared to MTV Indonesia, VH1 Indonesia focused on VH1 branding. It rarely broadcast East Asian music, although MTV Indonesia did occasionally. It also does not have its programming block on RCTI, TPI and Global TV either. Instead, it broadcast on some local stations, depending on what time it was shown. VH1 also does not air as a programming block on MNC Music Channel and MNC The Indonesian Channel.

Targets
VH1 Indonesia is targeted to all ages, especially adults, unlike MTV Indonesia, which is targeted always to teenagers.

Shows available

Stations that show VH1
VH1 is available in:
 JakTV in Jakarta
 STV in Bandung
 TV Borobudur in Semarang
 TATV in Solo
 SBO TV in Surabaya
 Makassar TV in Makassar
 Batam TV in Batam
 Deli TV in Medan
 Banjar TV in Banjarmasin
 You can get a network from to show local public broadcasting institutions (LPPL).

See also
 MTV Indonesia
 MTV Networks Asia Pacific

References

External links
 MTV Asia's History Site
 MTV Asia website

Television stations in Indonesia
Television channels and stations established in 2004
2004 establishments in Indonesia
Television channels and stations disestablished in 2008
2008 disestablishments in Indonesia
VH1
Music organizations based in Indonesia